Reclassified is the reissue of Australian rapper Iggy Azalea's debut studio album, The New Classic (2014). It was released internationally on 21 November 2014 by Virgin EMI Records, and in the United States on 24 November 2014 by Def Jam Recordings. Released seven months after its parent album, Reclassified featured five newly recorded songs.

It peaked at number sixteen on the US Billboard 200 becoming her second consecutive entry on the chart, also charting in countries such as Australia, Denmark, Sweden and the United Kingdom.

Reclassified was preceded by "Beg for It", featuring MØ, and "Trouble", featuring Jennifer Hudson the latter peaked at number seven in the UK Singles Chart.

Background
In April 2014, Azalea released her debut album The New Classic. Following its release, The New Classic debuted at number three on the US Billboard 200 and in the top five of several international markets. The album also topped the Billboard R&B/Hip-Hop Albums and Rap Albums charts. It was met with mixed reviews from music critics. The album's fourth single "Fancy" became a breakthrough hit for Azalea, peaking at number one on the US Billboard Hot 100, holding the top spot for seven consecutive weeks. It went on to become the longest running number one single from a female rapper as a lead artist surpassing "Lady Marmalade", which featured American rapper Lil' Kim. The following single "Black Widow" peaked at number three on the US Hot 100.

On 4 September 2014, Azalea announced that she would be reissuing her debut studio album The New Classic. She commented that a collaboration with English recording artist Ellie Goulding would be included on the forthcoming project, and previewed the tracks "Beg for It" and a scrapped solo recording from The New Classic recording sessions titled "Cheeks". Azalea later revealed that she would be collaborating with Ellie Goulding on a track called "Heavy Crown" featured in the film Kingsman: The Secret Service. In October, a friend of Azalea uploaded a video on her Instagram account. The video featured her and Azalea in a car, listening to the new song "Beg for It". Another song was also teased via Instagram entitled "Iggy SZN". Azalea then confirmed that "Beg for It", featuring Danish singer MØ, would be her next single. The album was recorded in Los Angeles.

New material

During an interview with Extra at the Vevo Certified SuperFanFest on 8 October 2014, Azalea commented that she was "really excited" about her upcoming release saying that the new material was "uptempo and fun," adding that she "did a lot more collaborations because I felt like I had doors open for me and I had the opportunity to collaborate with artists that I didn't have before when I made my first album, so this time I got to kind of call whoever I wanted up and do my dream collaborations – it's really exciting!" During yet another interview with Radio.com backstage at the CBS Radio We Can Survive concert at the Hollywood Bowl on 24 October 2014, Azalea mentioned her longtime desire to work with Ellie Goulding and after meeting several times she was approached by Goulding about a song that would become "Heavy Crown", recalling "she played it for me and I was in love with it and just felt it was so kind of appropriate for this to be our collaboration," because it "brings out something different in both artists that you don't usually see." Most notably, the track shows off an edgier side of Goulding, whose voice Azalea called "unique and ethereal sounding." "She loved it because she felt like she doesn't do things that are as aggressive as our song together," Azalea explained.

With the expanded re-release, Azalea also got to team up with Jennifer Hudson for a second time, after being featured on Hudson's song "He Ain't Goin' Nowhere" off her third studio album JHUD, "It kind of has a doo-wop feel," Azalea said, also mentioning her desire to do something different from her musical style and being excited about performing it; "It's kind of something you'd picture Aretha Franklin singing."

In contrast to the new material, some of the tracks from the original album were left off in favor of the newer songs. Older discarded songs included the Mavado-assisted "Lady Patra", "Impossible Is Nothing", "New Bitch", and intro track "Walk the Line".

Release and promotion
The artwork for Reclassified was revealed on 9 October 2014. Azalea then premiered an album track, "Iggy SZN", made available with the album pre-order on iTunes stores worldwide. She performed the first single "Beg for It", featuring MØ, for the first time in the fourth episode of Saturday Night Lives season 40, hosted by Jim Carrey. On 12 November, Azalea uploaded on her YouTube channel a preview of the first track on Reclassified, "We In This Bitch". On 14 November, another preview of "Heavy Crown" was also uploaded on the channel. On 17 November, a final album track preview for "Trouble", featuring Jennifer Hudson, was also unveiled. The reissue was released internationally on 21 November 2014 and in the United States on 24 November 2014. Azalea also performed "Beg for It" during a medley with "Fancy", featuring Charli XCX, at the 2014 American Music Awards at the Nokia Theatre L.A. Live in Los Angeles on 23 November 2014, where she won two awards for Favorite Rap/Hip-Hop Album and Favorite Rap/Hip-Hop Artist. On 24 November 2014, an official lyric video for the track premiered on her Vevo channel. She also teamed up with The Roots for a performance at The Tonight Show Starring Jimmy Fallon on 26 November 2014.

Singles
"Beg for It" was released as the first single from the reissue in the United States on 24 October 2014. It debuted at number ninety-two on the Billboard Hot 100 chart for the week ending 8 November 2014, peaking at number twenty-seven and becoming Azalea's sixth top 40 hit on the chart in 2014. In Australia, the song debuted at number seventy-three on the ARIA Singles Chart for the week ending 10 November 2014, and jumped to number twenty-nine on the following week.

"Trouble", featuring Jennifer Hudson, was released as the album's second single. On 4 February 2015, Azalea and Hudson performed the song for the first time by teaming up with The Roots on The Tonight Show Starring Jimmy Fallon. The song was serviced to mainstream radio stations in the US on 24 February 2015 and an accompanying music video was also shot earlier that month, having premiered on 27 February 2015 through Azalea's VEVO channel.

Besides the two new singles, all five singles from The New Classic re-appeared on Reclassified: "Work", "Change Your Life", "Bounce", "Fancy" and "Black Widow". The track "Iggy SZN" was also released as a promotional single prior to the album's release.

Critical reception
 
Jim Farber of the New York Daily News gave Reclassified three and a half out of five stars, praising the new tracks "We in This Bitch", "Heavy Crown", "Trouble", and "Iggy SZN", stating "Luckily, most of the tracks on Reclassified actually are worth it. That's vital, since only five of the songs qualify as genuinely new." Despite praising a majority of the new tracks, he expressed distaste towards "Beg for It", expressing that it seems lazy as it "merely turns the hook from 'Fancy' on its side." He concluded, "Though Azalea ends the album with an admission that the golden headdress of pop fame "comes and goes," she gleefully states, "bitch, I got it now." For the moment, it seems like she deserves it."

Mark Beaumont of NME gave it a rating of six out of ten, a higher score than the original album version review by the same publication, claiming that "the Aussie rapper offers a slight improvement on her debut LP with this reissue." Mike Wass of Idolator gave the album a 4/5 rating calling it "as good an opportunity as any to acknowledge that the femcee's debut is actually relentlessly enjoyable," adding that "there isn't a dud track" and "of the other new cuts, 'Heavy Crown' stands out as another future hit". Rory Cashin of State gave the album three out of five stars, commenting that "the new additions are mostly winners," but "just like her first time out with this album, Iggy has a problem; trying too hard to please herself and please commercial radio." David Jeffries of AllMusic, who had also reviewed The New Classic, gave it three and a half out of five stars and said, "In the end, Reclassified is a better effort than The New Classic and offers more bang for the buck, but this "release it until you get it right" blueprint is concerning for consumers, who now have a choice between rebuying it all or seeking out the new numbers on their own."

Commercial performance
In Australia, Reclassified debuted at number thirty-two on the ARIA Albums Chart for the week ending 1 December 2014, while appearing at number nineteen on its digital sales-only based version, the ARIA Digital Albums Chart, and also peaking at number 3 on the ARIA Urban Albums Chart. In the United States, it debuted at number twenty-seven on the Billboard 200 chart, with 33,638 album-equivalent units, while its parent album The New Classic also climbed back up to number seventy, with 14,155 units, for the week ending 30 November 2014. It peaked at number sixteen on the Billboard 200 chart for the week ending 4 January 2015, with 29,461 units, entering the top twenty for the first time due to a big boost as a function of album streams and single song sales. On the following week, it remained in the top twenty dropping two spots to number eighteen.
In the United Kingdom, the album debuted at number one hundred eighteen and charted at number fifty-nine on the Official UK Albums Chart Top 100 and number four on the UK R&B Albums Top 40 for the week ending 10 January 2015. On 10 May 2015, Reclassified climbed eighty places re-entering the Official UK Albums Chart Top 100 at a new peak of thirty-eight, after appearing at number twenty-two on the Official Midweek UK Albums Chart Update on 6 May 2015.

Track listing

Personnel
Credits for The New Classic adapted from Barnes & NoblePerformance creditsIggy Azalea – primary artist, vocals, background vocals
Paul Burton – trombone
1st Down – drums, keyboards
Michael Davis – trumpet
Jon Mills – guitar, drums, keyboards
T.I. – vocals
Jon Shave – drums, keyboards
Jason Pebworth – keyboards
George Astasio – guitar, drums, keyboards
Jennifer Hudson – vocals
Rita Ora – vocals
Ellie Goulding – vocals

Marco Bernardis – saxophone
Alex Oriet – guitar, drums, keyboards
Charli XCX – vocals 
Kurtis McKenzie – drums, keyboards
Darryl Reid – drums, keyboards
Ms. D – background vocals
David Phelan – guitar, drums, keyboards
MØ – Vocals
Raja Kumari – background vocals
Sean Momberger – keyboards
BB Diamond – vocals
Antonia Karamani – background vocalsTechnical credits'

Bill Mims – vocal engineer
Stuart Hawkes – mastering
Miles Showell – mastering
Stargate – programming, producer, instrumentation
Harvey Mason Jr. – vocal engineer
Andrew Hey – assistant vocal engineer
1st Down – programming, producer
Jon Mills – programming
Danny D. – executive producer
Eric Weaver – vocal engineer
Jon Shave – programming
Miles Walker – assistant vocal engineer
Jason Pebworth – programming
George Astasio – programming
Tim Blacksmith – executive producer
Adam Messinger – producer
Nasri Atweh – producer
Sam Farr – vocal engineer

Elliot Carter – vocal engineer
Alex Oriet – programming
Mikkel Eriksen – vocal engineer
The Invisible Men – producer
Sarah Stennett – executive producer
Kurtis McKenzie – programming
Darryl Reid – programming, producer
Daniel Zaidenstadt – vocal engineer
Reeva & Black – producer, vocal engineer
The Arcade – producer
David Phelan – programming
Chris Berdine – packaging
The Messengers – producer
Sean Momberger – programming
Thomas Whiteside – cover photo
Saltwives – producer

Charts

Weekly charts

Year-end charts

Certifications

Release history

References

Iggy Azalea albums
Island Records albums
Albums produced by Stargate
Albums produced by Benny Blanco
Albums produced by the Messengers (producers)
Reissue albums
2014 albums